Atlantic Theater Company is an Off-Broadway non-profit theater, whose mission is to produce great plays "simply and truthfully utilizing an artistic ensemble." The company was founded in 1985 by David Mamet, William H. Macy, and 30 of their acting students from New York University, inspired by the historical examples of the Group Theatre and Stanislavski.  Atlantic believes that the story of a play and the intent of its playwright are at the core of the creative process.

The company operates two theaters in the Chelsea neighborhood of Manhattan in New York City. There is the 199-seat mainstage Linda Gross Theater, which is located at 336 West 20th Street between Eighth and Ninth Avenues, in the parish hall of St. Peter's Episcopal Church, built in 1854 and renovated in 2012. Additionally, the 99-seat black-box theater, Stage 2, is located at 330 West 16th Street, also between Eighth and Ninth Avenues, in the former Port Authority building. Stage 2, which opened in June 2006, is the home of Atlantic’s development program for new plays, which encompasses the commissioning of new works, readings, workshops, and fully staged productions.

Productions
Since its inception, Atlantic has produced more than 200 plays, including the Tony Award winning productions of Spring Awakening and The Band's Visit, David Mamet’s adaptation of The Voysey Inheritance by Harley Granville Barker, Mamet’s Romance, Joe Penhall’s Blue/Orange, Dublin Carol by Conor McPherson, Woody Allen’s Writer’s Block, the revival of Hobson's Choice, the revivals of Mamet's American Buffalo, The Woods, and Edmond, Dangerous Corner by J. B. Priestley, The Cider House Rules, adapted by Peter Parnell, Celebration, The Room and The Hothouse by Harold Pinter, Mojo by Jez Butterworth, the New York premieres of Howard Korder’s Boys’ Life and The Lights at Lincoln Center Theater, Kevin Heelan’s Distant Fires, Quincy Long’s The Joy of Going Somewhere Definite and Shaker Heights, Tom Donaghy’s Minutes From The Blue Route, Edwin Sánchez’ Trafficking in Broken Hearts, and Missing Persons by Craig Lucas.

Atlantic has also had a notable collaboration with the Irish playwright Martin McDonagh, having premiered four of his plays in New York: Hangmen (2018), The Cripple of Inishmaan (2008), The Lieutenant of Inishmore (2006) and The Beauty Queen of Leenane (1998). The latter two transferred to Broadway. 
 

Other Mamet productions by Atlantic include his adaptation of Chekhov's Three Sisters, and his own plays The Blue Hour, Yes, But So What?, Revenge of the Space Pandas, The Poet and the Rent, Vermont Sketches, Reunion, Sexual Perversity in Chicago, The Duck Variations, The Water Engine,  Home, School, and Keep Your Pantheon. In February 2017, Mamet's play The Penitent started its previews leading to its premiere at the end of February.

In other recent productions, Atlantic has produced On the Shore of the Wide World by Simon Stephens, Describe the Night by Rajiv Joseph, The Homecoming Queen by Ngozi Anyanwu, The Great Leap by Lauren Yee, and This Ain't No Disco with music and lyrics by Stephen Trask and Peter Yanowitz.

Acting school
The Atlantic Acting School operates as both a private conservatory and an undergraduate program in conjunction with the New York University Tisch School of the Arts. The school focuses on the Practical Aesthetics, a philosophy and acting technique that grew out of a series of NYU summer workshops in Vermont in 1983 and 1984 with playwright David Mamet and actor William H. Macy. It fosters new generations of theater artists by creating a student ensemble that allows actors to hone their craft. Atlantic is committed to preparing its students for all aspects of a performing arts career.

A number of theater companies have been formed by former students of Atlantic Acting School, including Pipeline Theatre Company, Bluebird Theatre Company, The Joust Theatre Company, Harvard Sailing Team, Crashbox Theatre Company, Cake Productions, 3rd Kulture Kids, Acorn Pictures, Aggrocrag, Lesser America, Foolish Gentlemen Films, and The Plinth.

See also

 Culture of New York City
 List of Manhattan neighborhoods

References

External links

Atlantic Theater Company website

How the Atlantic Theater Makes a Hit

Performing groups established in 1985
Drama schools in the United States
Education in New York City
Theatre companies in New York City
Non-profit organizations based in New York City
Chelsea, Manhattan
Off-Broadway theaters
1985 establishments in New York City